Zvenyhorodka is a city located in the Cherkasy Oblast (province) in central Ukraine on the Hnylyi Tikych river. The town is the administrative center of the Zvenyhorodka Raion (district). It hosts the administration of Zvenyhorodka urban hromada, one of the hromadas of Ukraine. The city has a population of

History

Early history 
Zvenyhorodka has its origins in the days of the Kievan Rus' and the first mention of the city dates back to 1394, although its actual origins are likely to be older, as the city was previously destroyed during the Mongol invasion of Kievan Rus'. According to modern legend, the original city was situated 3km further from its current location, encircling a conical mountain.

In 1504 Zvenyhorodka became part of the Grand Duchy of Lithuania, after being relinquished by Meñli I Giray. It passed to the Crown of the Kingdom of Poland in 1569 following the capture of Right-bank Ukraine. Following this takeover, the population was subject to significant socio-economic oppression from the Polish aristocracy in the forms of various taxes. During the 1648-1654 Khmelnytsky Uprising, the townsfolk revolted and expelled the Polish nobility from the region. Zvenyhorodka then remained part of the Korsun Regiment, a military-territorial unit of the Hetman state, until the Polish crown regained control of Right-bank Ukraine in 1667 as per the Andrusiv Armistice.

Under Polish rule, the population suffered under socio-economic oppression again and fell victim to various national and religious hostilities. The Catholic clergy violently pursued a campaign of polarising Ukrainian nationals, which led to several uprisings in the 18th century. Haydamak forces were active in the area, led by the Cossack Gnat Goly, and they twice stormed the local castle, in 1737 and then 1743. Following these attacks, the Polish government built fortifications around the castle, including new towers and barracks.

During the Koliivshchyna rebellion in 1768, many residents of the city joined the insurgents in fighting against the Catholic church and Polish nobility, amongst others, due to the treatment of peasants and their serfdom. The rebellion was unsuccessful and the city remained under Polish control. In 1792 King Stanisław August Poniatowski granted Zwinogródka city rights under Magdeburg law and it became a royal city of Poland. In the following year it was annexed by Russia after the Second Partition of Poland.

Russian Empire 
From 1798 Zvenyhorodka became an administrative centre of uyezd in Kiev Governorate of the Russian Empire. The intensive development of trade owing to the inclusion of Zvenyhorodka in the Russian market allowed for rapid development of industries, in particularly dairy and lumber, as well as pottery and handicrafts. The city became one of the centres of the dairy industry alongside Chyhyryn and Bila Tserkva. In the 1830s the city saw considerable development including the construction of a local hospital, post office, telegraph communications, and a bridge over the river Hnylyi Tikich. Classes began at the parish school in 1833 with just over 20 students being educated and most of the population being illiterate at the time.

Post-war 
Around the turn to the 20th century the town had a train station, three Greek Orthodox churches and one Roman Catholic church.

A local newspaper has been published here since March 14, 1919.

Number of inhabitants in years 
 1850: 7, 501
 1897: 16, 972
 1926: 18, 020, 61% Ukrainians, 37% Jews, 1% Russians and 1% Poles.
 1989: 22, 740
 2013: 17, 958

Climate

Notable residents 
 Ahatanhel Krymsky (1871–1942), Ukrainian philologist and orientalist.
 David Günzburg (1857–1910), Russian orientalist and Jewish communal leader.
 Horace Günzburg (1833–1909), Russian philanthropist.
 Grigory Petrovich Nikulin (1895–1965), Russian Bolshevik and Chekist.

See also 

 List of cities in Ukraine

Gallery

References

Notes

Sources
 (1972) Історіа міст і сіл Української CCP - Черкаська область (History of Towns and Villages of the Ukrainian SSR - Cherkasy Oblast), Kyiv.

 
Cities in Cherkasy Oblast
Zvenigorodsky Uyezd (Kiev Governorate)
Kiev Voivodeship
Bratslav Voivodeship
Cities of district significance in Ukraine